Henrik Marklund (born June 25, 1994) is a Swedish ice hockey player. He is currently playing with Östersunds IK of the HockeyEttan.

Marklund made his Swedish Hockey League debut playing with Skellefteå AIK during the 2013–14 SHL season.

References

External links

1994 births
Living people
People from Skellefteå Municipality
Skellefteå AIK players
Swedish ice hockey right wingers
Sportspeople from Västerbotten County